Austin & Lindsey Adamec is the first extended play by Austin & Lindsey Adamec. They released the EP on March 25, 2016. The duo worked with Ian Eskelin, in the production of this EP.

Critical reception

Matt Conner, giving the EP four stars at CCM Magazine, states, "this [is a] moving set of songs." Awarding the EP three and a half stars from New Release Today, Mikayla Shriver writes, "Amidst all of the fantastic worship music being released in 2016, Austin and Lindsey Adamec's self-titled EP deserves a listen...or ten" Jonathan Andre, giving the EP four and a half stars at 365 Days of Inspiring Media, describes, "Well done to the duo for such an honest portrayal of worship music". Rating the EP a 97 out of 100 for Jesus Wired, Rebekah Joy states, "this worship EP is an incredible breath of fresh air for worship music. The incredibly rich, and pure vocals blend together in a way that is unique and hard to find these days. The honest and meaningful lyrics are simply beautiful songs of praise." 

Allotting the EP four star review at Worship Leader, Amanda Furbeck states, "A&LA is  five well-crafted original songs that tell the personal and spiritual victories of Austin and Lindsey." Jeremy Barnes, indicating in a three and a half star review by Jesus Freak Hideout, says, "At the end of the day, the strength of the combined vocals of these two talented musicians, and the dedication to the faithful delivery of a heartfelt testimony, validate a thoughtful and relevant release." Signaling in a four star review from Today's Christian Entertainment, Laura Chambers writes, "Their self-titled EP perfectly captures their decision to make their marriage a threefold cord, with Jesus ever in the brilliant center."

Ken Wiegman, reviewing the EP at Alpha Omega News, says, "Mostly because of the range of vocal possibilities; either in harmonies or switching leads. It is no different with Austin and Lindsey, as they trade off leads and  each other with beautiful harmonies...Add to that the depth of the lyrical content and you have an amazing worship album. The duo tackles some fairly big theological themes; Christ’s death and resurrection, miracles, and grace...It’s a great backstory that gives them credibility." Rewarding the album a four star rating at The Christian Beat, Madeleine Dittmer says, "These songs with their powerful lyrics and beautiful melodies certainly deserve a place among other worship favorites, and are a must listen for CCM fans."

Track listing

References

2016 EPs